Mere Hamdam Mere Dost is a 1968 film starring Dharmendra, Sharmila Tagore, Rehman, Mumtaz and Om Prakash. The music is by Laxmikant Pyarelal and the lyrics by Majrooh Sultanpuri. The film is directed by Amar Kumar and produced by Kewal Kumar under the production banner Kawaljit Productions. The movie was a blockbuster.

Plot summary 
Sunil (Dharmendra) lives a middle class life with his mother and sister in Delhi. He works for Chopra & Co., Chartered Accountants. He comes across a beautiful woman posing for a painting, and thinks she is poor and needy, and gives her a tip. The woman's name is Anita, and both are attracted to each other. Sunil and Anita intend to marry, and Sunil even introduces Anita to his mother. One day when attending a party, Sunil is shocked to learn that Anita is a multi-millionaire. Stunned at this deception, he swears he will have nothing to do with her. When Anita attempts to soothe things over, Sunil does cool down. It is then he finds out that Anita's dad, who is serving time, had killed his father, and that Anita's mother is still alive, after making her living as a former prostitute.

Cast
 Dharmendra as Sunil
 Sharmila Tagore as Anita
 Rehman as Ajit Narang
 Mumtaz as Meena
 Om Prakash as Dhand Melaram
 Achala Sachdev as Sunil's mom
 Nigar Sultana as Mohinii
 Ruby Myers as Mrs. Modi
 Santosh Kumar as Ramesh
 Brahm Bhardwaj as Chopra

Soundtrack
Composed by the music duo Laxmikant Pyarelal, the songs of the film are penned by Majrooh Sultanpuri.

References

External links 
 

1968 films
1960s Hindi-language films
Films scored by Laxmikant–Pyarelal